Brache is a surname. Notable people with the surname include:

Cristine Brache (born 1984), American artist and writer
Marcel Brache (born 1987), American rugby union player
Rafael Brache (1888–1965), Dominican Republic politician, civil servant, and diplomat